Popol Vuh is a work of mythology and history of the Quiché Maya of Guatemala.

Popol Vuh may also refer to:

Popol Vuh (band), an ambient/krautrock musical group from Germany
Popol Ace, a Norwegian progressive rock band formerly named Popol Vuh
"Popol Vuh I", "Popul Vuh II" and "Popul Vuh III", songs by British group Flying Saucer Attack from Flying Saucer Attack and Chorus
Popol Vuh (Ginastera), an incomplete orchestral suite by Argentinian composer Alberto Ginastera